Renzo Wéjième (born 9 September 1999) is a New Caledonian footballer who plays as a midfielder for New Caledonian club AS Magenta, New Caledonia under-20 and the New Caledonian national team.

Club career
Wéjième started his career in the youth of OMS Paita. In 2015 he moved to the first team and made his debut. In 2017 he moved to New Caledonian powerhouse AS Magenta.

National team
In 2017 Wéjième was called up by François Tartas for the New Caledonia national football team to play at the 2017 Pacific Mini Games. He made his debut on December 2, 2017, in a 2–1 loss against Vanuatu where he played the whole 90 minutes.

References

New Caledonian footballers
Association football midfielders
New Caledonia international footballers
Living people
1999 births
AS Magenta players